The Vespertine World Tour was a tour by the singer Björk that focused on her album Vespertine. She also performed songs from Debut, Post, Homogenic and Selmasongs. She performed 35 shows on this tour and 31 different songs. The tour band consisted of harpist Zeena Parkins, electronic duo Matmos, a Greenlandic choir and a 70-piece orchestra (local to each venue). The tour was released on DVD as Live at Royal Opera House and the concert held at the Orchard Hall in Tokyo, Japan was broadcast on Japanese TV-station WOWOW. A separate release, Vespertine Live, contains a selection of Björk's favourite performances from throughout the Vespertine tour, while a tour documentary, Minuscule, was also released.

In early August 2001, Björk confirmed the first set of dates for the Vespertine World Tour which would take place at opera houses, theatres, and small venues, with favourable acoustics for the concerts. She enlisted Matmos, Zeena Parkins, a choir of Inuit girls from Greenland, and conductor Simon Lee; the tour opened at the Grand Rex in Paris on 18 August. While in Paris, she held a press conference to discuss the album but gave no individual interviews saying that: "she'd rather do music than talk about it." While in France she also received the National Order of Merit at the Ministry of National Education in Paris. Another press conference was held in Barcelona on 3 November 2001 while touring in Spain. A 16 December 2001 performance at the Royal Opera House in London was released as the DVD Live at Royal Opera House in 2002. A DVD release featuring a behind-the-scenes look at the tour, titled Minuscule, was released at the end of 2003. Vespertine Live, a live album consisting of songs recorded during the Vespertine World Tour, was included in the 2003 box set Live Box; it also includes a live version of "All Is Full of Love", a song from Homogenic.

Opening acts 
 Matmos

Songs Performed

Tour dates

References

2001 concert tours
Björk concert tours